Chennaaya Valarthiya Kutty is a 1976 Indian Malayalam-language film, directed and produced by Kunchacko. The film stars Prem Nazir, Sharada, Jayabharathi and Adoor Bhasi. The film has musical score by M. K. Arjunan.

Cast
 
Prem Nazir 
Sharada 
Jayabharathi 
K. P. Ummer 
M. G. Soman 
Adoor Bhasi 
Thikkurissy Sukumaran Nair 
Sankaradi 
Unnimary 
Adoor Pankajam 
Alummoodan 
Baby Sumathi 
Cherthala Thankam
Janardanan 
Master Raghu 
Premji 
Haseena Aman
Radhika 
Hema 
Changanassery Natarajan

Soundtrack
The music was composed by M. K. Arjunan.

References

External links
 

1976 films
1970s Malayalam-language films